Before the Act of Union 1707, the barons of the shire of Bute elected commissioners to represent them in the unicameral Parliament of Scotland and in the Convention of Estates. After 1708, Buteshire and Caithness alternated in returning one member the House of Commons of Great Britain and later to the House of Commons of the United Kingdom.

List of shire commissioners

 1644: Sir Robert Montgomery of Skelmorlie
 1644–45: Sir James Stewart of Kirktoun, sheriff 
 1648: Laird of Kilchattane (Stewart)
 1648: Laird of Kames (Bannatyne)
 1651: Laird of Askog (Stewart)
 1661–63: Sir James Stewart of Kirktoun
 1665 (convention) 
 1667 (convention)
 1669–70: Sir Dugald Stewart of Bute 
 1669–74, 
 1678 (convention) 
 1681–82: Ninian Bannantyne of Kames 
 1685–86: John Boyle of Kelburn
 1689 (convention)
 1689–93,  
 1689–98: David Boyle, later the 1st Earl of Glasgow
 1693–1702: William Stewart of Ambrismore 
 1702–03: Sir James Stewart (or Stuart) of Bute, sheriff (ennobled 1703) 
 1702–07: Robert Stewart of Tillicoultry
 1704–07: John Steuart of Kinwhinlick

References

See also
 List of constituencies in the Parliament of Scotland at the time of the Union

Constituencies of the Parliament of Scotland (to 1707)
Constituencies disestablished in 1707
1707 disestablishments in Scotland
Politics of the county of Bute